The 30th Young Artist Awards ceremony, presented by the Young Artist Association, honored excellence of young performers under the age of 21 in the fields of film, television and theater for the 2008 season, and took place on March 29, 2009 at Universal Studios' Globe Theatre in Universal City, California.  Special guest performers for the ceremony that year included Russian musical artists, "Street Magic" and Las Vegas father and son acrobat team, "The Kalinins."

Established in 1978 by long-standing Hollywood Foreign Press Association member Maureen Dragone, the Young Artist Association was the first organization to establish an awards ceremony specifically set to recognize and award the contributions of performers under the age of 21 in the fields of film, television, theater and music.

Categories 
★ Bold indicates the winner in each category.

Best Performance in a Feature Film

Best Performance in a Feature Film - Leading Young Actor
★ Nate Hartley - Drillbit Taylor - Paramount Pictures
Freddie Highmore - The Spiderwick Chronicles - Paramount Pictures
Josh Hutcherson - Journey to the Center of the Earth - Warner Brothers
Skandar Keynes - The Chronicles of Narnia: Prince Caspian - Walt Disney Pictures

Best Performance in a Feature Film - Leading Young Actress
★ Dakota Fanning - The Secret Life of Bees - Fox Searchlight
Abigail Breslin - Kit Kittredge: An American Girl - New Line Cinema
Madeline Carroll - Swing Vote - Walt Disney Pictures
Georgie Henley - The Chronicles of Narnia: Prince Caspian - Walt Disney Pictures
Keke Palmer - The Longshots - MGM

Best Performance in a Feature Film - Supporting Young Actor
★ Brandon Soo Hoo - Tropic Thunder - DreamWorks SKG
Dylan Everett - The Devil’s Mercy - Peace Arch Entertainment
Colin Ford - Lake City - Screen Media Films
Nathan Gamble - Marley & Me - 20th Century Fox
Devon Gearhart - Funny Games - Warner Independent Pictures
Justin Jones - The Express: The Ernie Davis Story - Universal Pictures
Johntae Lipscomb - Bedtime Stories - Universal Pictures
Austin MacDonald - Kit Kittredge: An American Girl - New Line Cinema
Zach Mills - Kit Kittredge: An American Girl - New Line Cinema

Best Performance in a Feature Film - Supporting Young Actress
★ Christian Serratos - Twilight - Summit Entertainment
Madisen Beaty - The Curious Case of Benjamin Button - Warner Brothers
Sammi Hanratty - Hero Wanted - Sony Pictures Entertainment
Kali Majors - Baby Blues - Allumination Filmworks

Best Performance in a Feature Film - Young Ensemble Cast
★ Kit Kittredge: An American Girl - New Line CinemaAbigail Breslin, Madison Davenport, Austin MacDonald, Zach Mills, Willow Smith and Max Thieriot 
The Chronicles of Narnia: Prince Caspian - Walt Disney Pictures
Georgie Henley, Skandar Keynes, William Moseley and Anna Popplewell 
Drillbit Taylor - Paramount Pictures
David Dorfman, Troy Gentile and Nate Hartley

Best Performance in an International Feature Film
Best Performance in an International Feature Film - Leading Young Performers
★ Brandon Walters (Australia) - Australia - 20th Century FoxHussein Al-Sous & Udey Al-Qiddissi (Jordan) - Captain Abu Raed - NeoClassics
Asa Butterfield & Jack Scanlon (United Kingdom) - The Boy in the Striped Pyjamas - Heyday Films/Miramax Films
Kåre Hedebrant & Lina Leandersson (Sweden) - Let the Right One In - Magnet Releasing
Robbie Kay (United Kingdom) - Fugitive Pieces - Samuel Goldwyn Films
Guang Li (Australia) - The Children of Huang Shi - Sony Pictures Classics
Bill Milner & Will Poulter (United Kingdom) - Son of Rambow - Paramount Vantage
Kodi Smit-McPhee (Australia) - Romulus, My Father - Magnolia Pictures
Xu Jiao (China) - CJ7 - Sony Pictures Classics

Best Performance in a Short Film
Best Performance in a Short Film - Young Actor
★ Cainan Wiebe - A Pickle
Patrick Casa - Sizzlean
Andy Scott Harris - The First Impression
Joey Luthman - Stars and Suns
Connor Kramme - Alex's Halloween
Gig Morton - The Escape of Conrad Lardbottom
Brandon Tyler Russell - Caleb Couldn’t Love
Randy Shelly - Settled at Sunrise
Connor Stanhope - Illusional

Best Performance in a Short Film - Young Actress
★ Laytrel McMullen - Pudge
Jasmine Jessica Anthony - Water Pills
Megan Ashley - Wreck the Halls
Megan McKinnon - Illusional
Savannah McReynolds - Return to Sender
Courtney Robinson - Little Miss Badass
Emanuela Szumilas - The Corners of Our Rooms
Chelsey Valentine - The Doll Hospital
Jolie Vanier - Juvenile Delinquence

Best Performance in a TV Movie, Miniseries or Special

Best Performance in a TV Movie, Miniseries or Special - Leading Young Actor
★ Alex Black - Generation Gap - RHI Entertainment
Luke Benward - Minutemen - Disney Channel
Jamie Johnston - The Tenth Circle - Lifetime Television
Robbie Kay - Pinocchio - RAI Fiction
Maxim Knight - Our First Christmas - RHI Entertainment
Connor Christopher Levins - The Most Wonderful Time of the Year - Hallmark Channel
Austin Majors - An Accidental Christmas - Lifetime Television
Justin Martin - A Raising in the Sun - ABC
Gig Morton - Christmas Town - Peace Arch Entertainment

Best Performance in a TV Movie, Miniseries or Special - Leading Young Actress
★ Selena Gomez - Another Cinderella Story - Warner Brothers
Jordy Benattar - Charlie & Me - Hallmark Channel
Demi Lovato - Camp Rock - Disney Channel
Jennifer Lawrence - The Poker House - Phase 43 Films
Miranda Cosgrove - Merry Christmas, Drake & Josh - Nickelodeon Productions

Best Performance in a TV Movie, Miniseries or Special - Supporting Young Actor
★ Joseph Castanon - Comanche Moon - CBS
Adam Cagley - Merry Christmas Drake and Josh - Nickelodeon
Alexander Conti - Snow 2: Brain Freeze - ABC Family
David Gore - Merry Christmas Drake and Josh -Nickelodeon
Steven Hinkle - John Adams - HBO
Matthew Knight - The Good Witch - Hallmark Channel
Uriah Shelton - The Nanny Express - Hallmark Channel
Tyler Stentiford - The Memory Keeper's Daughter - Lifetime Television

Best Performance in a TV Movie, Miniseries or Special - Supporting Young Actress
★ Cassidi Hoag - The Two Mr. Kissels - Lifetime Television
Hannah Endicott Douglas - The Good Witch - Hallmark Channel
Jodelle Ferland - Celine - CBC
Molly Jepson - Minutemen - Disney Channel
Nicole Munoz - Another Cinderella Story - Warner Brothers

Best Performance in a TV Series

Best Performance in a TV Series (Comedy or Drama) - Leading Young Actor
★ Graham Patrick Martin - The Bill Engvall Show - TBS
Jake T. Austin - Wizards of Waverly Place - Disney Channel
Jamie Johnston - Degrassi: The Next Generation - CTV
Nathan Kress - iCarly - Nickelodeon
Nat Wolff - The Naked Brothers Band - Nickelodeon

Best Performance in a TV Series (Comedy or Drama) - Leading Young Actress
★ Miranda Cosgrove - iCarly - Nickelodeon
Miley Cyrus - Hannah Montana - Disney Channel
Selena Gomez - Wizards of Waverly Place - Disney Channel
Taylor Momsen - Gossip Girl - Warner Brothers
Vanessa Morgan - The Latest Buzz - Decode Entertainment
Shailene Woodley - The Secret Life of the American Teenager - ABC Family

Best Performance in a TV Series (Comedy or Drama) - Supporting Young Actor
★ Larramie "Doc" Shaw - Tyler Perry's House of Payne - TNT
Moisés Arias - Hannah Montana - Disney Channel
Skyler Gisondo - The Bill Engvall Show - TBS
Mark Indelicato - Ugly Betty - ABC
Ryan Malgarini - Gary Unmarried - CBS

Best Performance in a TV Series (Comedy or Drama) - Supporting Young Actress
★ Bella Thorne - My Own Worst Enemy - NBC
Jennifer Lawrence - The Bill Engvall Show - TBS
Jennette McCurdy - iCarly - Nickelodeon
Kathryn Newton - Gary Unmarried - CBS
Emily Osment - Hannah Montana - Disney Channel
Erin Sanders - Zoey 101 - Nickelodeon

Best Performance in a TV Series - Guest Starring Young Actor
★  (tie) Carlos Knight - ER - NBC
★  (tie) Joey Luthman - Private Practice - ABC
Jesse Bostick - Murdoch Mysteries - Bravo
Nathan Gamble - House M.D. - FOX
Hunter Gomez - The Suite Life of Zack & Cody - Disney Channel
Isaiah Marcus Grant - The Border - White Pine Pictures
Braeden Lemasters - Law & Order NBC
Dylan Minnette - The Mentalist - CBS
Remy Thorne - October Road - ABC
Billy Unger - Medium - NBC
Cainan Wiebe - Sanctuary - Sci-Fi Channel

Best Performance in a TV Series - Guest Starring Young Actress
★ Nicole Leduc - Supernatural - Warner Brothers
Isabella Acres - The Mentalist - CBS
Kaylee Dodson - Leverage - TNT
Brighid Fleming - Criminal Minds - CBS
Isabelle Fuhrman - Ghost Whisperer - CBS
Joey King - CSI: Crime Scene Investigation - CBS
Carly Schroeder - Ghost Whisperer - CBS
Stefanie Scott - Chuck - NBC
Car'ynn Sims - Everybody Hates Chris - CBS Paramount
Bella Thorne - October Road - ABC

Best Performance in a TV Series - Recurring Young Actor
★ Mick Hazen - As the World Turns - CBS
Eddie Alderson - One Life to Live - ABC
Preston Bailey - Dexter - Showtime
Aaron Hart - Mad Men - AMC
Joey Luthman - Weeds - Showtime
Dylan Minnette - Saving Grace - TNT
Terrell Ransom, Jr - Days of Our Lives - NBC
Connor Stanhope - Smallville - CW Television
Austin Williams - One Life to Live - ABC

Best Performance in a TV Series - Recurring Young Actress
★ Erin Sanders - The Young and the Restless - CBS
Kristen Alderson - One Life to Live - ABC
Darcy Rose Byrnes - The Young and the Restless - CBS
Danielle Hanratty - The Unit - FOX
Haley Ramm - Without a Trace CBS
Christina Robinson - Dexter - Showtime
Kiernan Shipka - Mad Men - AMC
Mackenzie Smith - Terminator: The Sarah Connor Chronicles - FOX
Brittany Underwood - One Life to Live - ABC

Outstanding Young Ensemble in a TV Series
★ The Bill Engvall Show - TBSSkyler Gisondo, Graham Patrick Martin and Jennifer LawrenceCory in the House - Disney Channel
Jason Dolley, Kyle Massey, Madison Pettis and Jake Thomas 
iCarly - Nickelodeon
Miranda Cosgrove, Nathan Kress, Jennette McCurdy and Noah Munck 
One Life to Live - ABC
Eddie Alderson, Kristen Alderson, Camila Banus, Carmen LoPorto and Austin Williams

Best Performance in a Voice-Over Role
Best Performance in a Voice-Over Role - Young Actor
★ David Gore - Fly Me to the Moon - Summit EntertainmentZachary Bloch - Super Why! (episode: "The Little Mermaid") - PBS
Alexander Conti - Di-Gata Defenders - Luxanimation
Alex Ferris - Martha Speaks - PBS
Colin Ford - Christmas Is Here Again - MyNetwork TV
Zachary Gordon - Madagascar: Escape 2 Africa - DreamWorks Animation/Paramount Pictures
Thomas Stanley - Madagascar: Escape 2 Africa - DreamWorks Animation/Paramount Pictures

Best Performance in a Voice-Over Role - Young Actress
★ Emily Hirst - The Girl Who Leapt Through Time (English version) - Bandai EntertainmentShelby Adamowsky - Horton Hears a Who! - 20th Century Fox
Selena Gomez - Horton Hears a Who! - 20th Century Fox
Joey King - Horton Hears a Who! - 20th Century Fox
Ashley McGullam - Return to Sender - Heavy B Productions
Chloë Grace Moretz - My Friends Tigger & Pooh - Walt Disney Television

Best Performance in a DVD Film
Best Performance in a DVD Film
★ Billy Unger - Cop Dog - Marvista EntertainmentJack Knight - A Lobster Tale - Peace Arch Entertainment
Matthew Knight - Christmas in Wonderland - Yari Film Group
Gig Morton - Snow Buddies - Walt Disney Studios Home Entertainment
Stefanie Scott - Beethoven's Big Break - Universal Studios

Best Performance in Live Theater
Best Performance in Live Theater / Host
★ Shemar Charles - Pop It! - Hop To It ProductionsEmily Albrecht - Ruthless! The Musical - Simi Valley Cultural Arts Center
Logan O'Brien - Digital Video Editing & Video Camera Techniques - The Young Filmmakers Club

Special awards
Outstanding Live Family Act
★ "The Kalinins" – Misha and Ivan Kalinin (Father and Son) – AcrobatsOutstanding International Feature Film Ensemble
★ Slumdog Millionaire (India)Ayush Mahesh Khedekar, Azharuddin Mohammed Ismail, Rubina Ali, Tanay Chheda, Ashutosh Lobo Gajiwala, Tanvi Ganesh Lonkar, Farzana Ansari, Chirag Parmar and Siddesh PatilOutstanding Broadway Musial Ensemble
★ Billy Elliot the Musical
David Álvarez, Trent Kowalik, Kiril Kulish, David Bologna, Frank Dolce and Erin Whyland

Jackie Coogan Award

Contribution to Youth
★ Kenny Ortega, Producer / Director / Choreographer – High School Musical

Michael Landon Award

Contribution to Youth
★ Gary Sinise, Actor / Humanitarian – Co-Founder: Operation Iraqi Children

Social Relations of Knowledge Institute Award
★ Brink - The Science ChannelOutstanding Contribution to Family Entertainment
★ Bolt
★ Captain Abu Raed
★ The Lucky Ones
★ Mamma Mia!
★ WALL-E

References

External links 
Official site

Young Artist Awards ceremonies
2008 film awards
2008 television awards
2009 in American cinema
2009 in American television
2009 in California